Ransford Agyapong is a Ghanaian politician and a former member of parliament for the Suhum Constituency of the eastern region of Ghana. He is currently the chairman for New Patriotic Party elections committee of the suhum constituency.

Early life and education 
Agyapong hails from suhum in the eastern region of Ghana.

Politics 
Agyapong is a member of the 3rd Parliament of the 4th republic of Ghana. His political career begun in 1996 when he contested as a parliamentary candidate for the suhum constituency on the ticket of the New Patriotic Party and lost to Solomon Kodjoe Akwetey of the national democratic congress who obtained 18,181 making 43.90% of the total valid votes cast that year. He contested again in 2000 Ghanaian general elections and won this time with a total of 16,494 making 54.90% of the total valid votes cast that year. His political career ended during his last year in office in 2004.

Career 
Agyapong is currently the chairman for New Patriotic Party elections committee of the suhum constituency. He is also the former member of Parliament for the Suhum Constituency in the Eastern Region of Ghana.

References 

Living people
New Patriotic Party politicians
Ghanaian MPs 2001–2005
Government ministers of Ghana
People from Eastern Region (Ghana)
21st-century Ghanaian politicians
Year of birth missing (living people)